St George Parish is one of the 57 parishes of Cumberland County, New South Wales, a cadastral unit for use on land titles. It is bounded in the north by the Cooks River, in the west of Cox's Creek and Salt Pan Creek, and in the south by the Georges River.

The parish covers the local government area of Georges River Council (in the southeast), the western part of Bayside Council (formerly the City of Rockdale) in the northeast, and the eastern part of the City of Canterbury-Bankstown (formerly the City of Canterbury) in the northwest.

The name of the parish is used as the region name today, although most customary uses of the region name refer to the part of the parish that lies in Georges River Council and Bayside Council, and not the part of the parish that lies in the City of Bankstown-Canterbury.

References

Parishes of Cumberland County
St George (Sydney)